The Bethesda Baptist Church and Cemetery in Greene County, Georgia near Union Point, Georgia was built in 1818.  It was listed on the National Register of Historic Places in 1998. The listing included two contributing buildings, two contributing structures, and two contributing sites.

The complex is located at the junction of County Rd. 120 and County Rd. 129. It includes a two-story brick church from c.1818 built in vernacular Federal style, with brick laid in American bond. It has interior end brick chimneys.

References

Baptist churches in Georgia (U.S. state)
National Register of Historic Places in Greene County, Georgia
Federal architecture in Georgia (U.S. state)
Buildings and structures completed in 1818